Uththara is a 2010 Sri Lankan Sinhala family drama film directed by Sandun Rajakaruna and produced by Vaijira Rajapakse for Cinelka Films. It stars Suraj Mapa, debut actress Hashini Gonagala and Sanath Gunathilake in lead roles along with Anton Jude and Upeksha Swarnamali. Music composed by Rohana Weerasinghe. It is the 1134th Sri Lankan film in the Sinhala cinema.

The film has been shot in and around many locations in Colombo, Matale and Nuwara Eliya. A felicitation ceremony was held in Matale on February 22 at 9 am organized by Dr. Jayasena Beligala and Panhinda Education Institute.

Plot

Cast
 Suraj Mapa as Shanilka
 Hashini Gonagala as Uththara
 Sanath Gunathilake as Minister Niwanthudawa
 Rebeka Nirmali as Rupa
 Lal Kularatne
 Anton Jude as Victor
 Daya Alwis as Emmanuel 
 Sahan Ranwala as Praveen Pathiratne
 Sarath Chandrasiri as Jananatha
 Vishaka Siriwardana
 Maureen Charuni as Shanilka's mother
 Janith Wickramage as Shanilka's friend
 Upeksha Swarnamali
 Tyrone Michael
 Kumara Thirimadura as Security officer

Soundtrack

References

2010 films
2010s Sinhala-language films
2010 drama films
Sri Lankan drama films